Aglossa pinguinalis, the large tabby or grease moth, is a moth in the subfamily Pyralinae. The species was first described by Carl Linnaeus in his 1758 10th edition of Systema Naturae.

The forewings are greyish brown clouded with a darker hue. They are covered by two indented lines. The dark-hued larvae feed on animal fats, greasy clothing, animal droppings, dead vegetation, fruit and grasses.

Native to the Palearctic. It has been introduced in North America. It has also been introduced to New Zealand.

References

Pyralini
Moths described in 1758
Moths of Europe
Moths of Africa
Moths of Asia
Moths of New Zealand
Taxa named by Carl Linnaeus